Shaykh Ali al-Khawas was a prominent 16th-century Muslim Sufi poet and mystic.

Influence
One of Al-Khawas' students was the Egyptian scholar and mystic Sharani.

References

16th-century Egyptian people
Sufi teachers
Sufis